The Toyota Chaser is a mid-size car produced by Toyota in Japan. Most Chasers are four-door sedans and hardtop sedans; a two-door hardtop coupé was available on the first generation only. It was introduced on the 1976 Toyota Corona Mark II platform, and was sold new by Toyota at Toyota Vista Store dealerships only in Japan, together with the Toyota Cresta.

The Toyota Chaser has been known as one of the 'triplet sedans' of Toyota, because it shares the same chassis with the Toyota Cressida/Mark II, and the Cresta, and afforded Toyota the opportunity to sell one platform at several different dealership sales channels. Most of the models use double wishbone suspension with coil springs, especially beginning with the X81 series. The Chaser and its platform sisters are considered a class below the Crown, allowing Toyota to offer a sedan with similar levels of luxury content, yet offering buyers lower tax liability and a more sporty image with a slightly smaller body length.



1st Generation (X30, X40; 1977)

The Chaser was first produced in July 1977 with chassis codes X30, X31, X40 and X41, and evolved from the X20 generation Mark II GSS hardtop coupe. They were powered by the four-cylinder 1.8-liter 3T-U, 13T-U and 2-liter 18R-U, and the six-cylinder 2.0 L M-U/EU engines – all single cam engines tuned for economy and clean emissions rather than performance. The Chaser is a lightly redesigned Toyota Mark II, with a wider front grille and without parking lights. The Chaser also has taillights of a different design. Unlike the Mark II, there were no station wagons or commercial models offered.

Engine displacements of 1.8 L and 2.0 L were offered to keep the annual road tax bill affordable to Japanese buyers. The Chaser was offered as a competitor to the Nissan Skyline coupé and sedan. The performance image was shared with the Toyota Celica Camry, also introduced at the same time, but at a different Japanese dealership called Toyota Corolla Store.

2nd Generation (X60; 1980)

Production swapped to the X60 Chaser in 1980, with the addition of the new 2.0-litre six-cylinder 1G-EU single cam petrol engine and a 2.2 L four-cylinder L-series diesel engine. Body styles offered were a four-door sedan and 4-door hardtop, no longer offering the 2-door hardtop with this generation (replaced by first generation Toyota Soarer). The "Avante" trim level had a sport tuned suspension using Michelin tires. This generation saw a new competitor from Nissan called the Nissan Leopard with a lower asking price in comparison to the Japanese market favorite, the Skyline. In August 1982, the 2.0 L 6–cylinder 1G-GEU twincam engine was added.

3rd Generation (X70; 1984)

This series first appeared in August 1984. The "Avante" series previously introduced became a luxury upgrade starting with this generation and body styles were reduced again to a 4-door hardtop only. The exterior dimensions of this car were slightly smaller in comparison to sister cars Mark II and Cresta, but the Chaser was more performance oriented, while maintaining the advanced features and luxurious interior of the Cresta. October 1985, Mark II / Cresta 1G-GTEU vehicles equipped with "GT twin turbo" has appeared. Disc brakes are larger in diameter, and was now equipped with bucket seats, but Toyota's TEMS electronic suspension wasn't installed. Only Chaser "GT twin turbo S" 5-speed MT that there was only low-cost upgrades (early types only.)

Minor change in August 1986. The 1G-GEU engine received various improvements, while the LPG-powered engine was changed to the 3Y-PU. As for appearance, larger bumpers and a new front grille accompanied substantial changes to the equipment. The early type rear combination lamps were kept with minor revisions. In January 1987 a special edition "Lordly" was released, in May 1987 the special edition "Chaser Avante" was released. August 1987 brought the "New Extra XG Chaser" special edition. In September 1987 new versions of the 2L and 2L-T diesel engines complying with the 1986 car emissions standards were introduced. January 1988 special edition "Avante Supra" released as a companion to the third-generation Supra. In April 1988 special edition "Extra XG with Auto Air Conditioner" was launched.

4th Generation (X80; 1988)

In August 1988, the X81 series of Chasers were introduced to the Japanese market. The following models were offered: XL, XG, Raffine, SXL, Avante, Avante Twin Cam 24, GT Twin Turbo and Avante G, with the GT Twin Turbo model the most powerful variant, powered by the 1G-GTE engine putting out  at 6200 rpm. The Avante G model was the highest special edition model in terms of equipment. In August 1989, two more models were added to the Avante lineup: the Avante G-L, an even more luxurious model of the Avante G (which was already highly equipped for a car of the time), and a new Avante G with a 3.0 L normally aspirated 7M-GE engine replacing the 2.0 L supercharged 1G-GZE from the previous model.

In August 1990, there were major revisions to the entire Chaser lineup and some of the models received entirely new engines. The top-range models, Avante G and GT Twin Turbo, received the new 2.5 L 1JZ engine, the same type that powered Toyota's contemporary sports car, the JZA70 Supra, although the 3.0 L Avante G remained part of the line.

5th Generation (X90; 1992)

In October 1992, the X90 Chaser replaced the previous X81 Chaser. It had a larger body, better handling and more engine power. The body was curvier and the car was significantly longer. The Chaser lineup was largely carried over from the X81 Chaser except the GT Twin Turbo, which was abolished and replaced by the new Tourer V. The top-of-the-line Avante G model received a  natural aspirated 2JZ-GE, the next evolution of the JZ series of engines after the 1JZ. The Tourer V was equipped with the 1JZ-GTE engine as the most powerful offering. Manual transmissions were optional for all engine offerings, from the 1.8 liter 4S-FE and 2.4 turbodiesel 2L-TE up through the 2.0 1G-FE inline 6 and 1JZ-GE 2.5 inline 6. The Tourer S trim received the non-turbo 1JZ-GE. In September 1992, the Tourer models received equipment upgrades, although not to the level of the Avante G, and their prices were correspondingly higher.

With the retirement of the Cressida model after the X81 generation, only the Mark II, Chaser, and Cresta were sold in the Japanese car market. Each of the members of the Cressida family supposedly had different characteristics - the Chaser was geared towards sporty driving, the Cresta towards luxury, and the Mark II was the baseline model. Apart from trim, the cars mostly differed in front and rear end design, with the Cresta also receiving different doors.

6th Generation (X100; 1996)

In September 1996, the X100 Chaser replaced the X90 Chaser. The product lineup consisted mostly of Avante and Tourer trim, with the Avante as the luxury model (with more interior accessories) and the Tourer as the sporty model (with large 16-inch wheels). Toyota's VVTi, the company's version of variable-valve timing, was added to the 1JZ engines; they were also upgraded to have more torque, since they had already reached the agreed voluntary limit set by Japanese Automobile Manufacturer's Association regarding horsepower. The 1JZ-GTE was powered by a single turbo configuration instead of the twin turbo of its predecessors. New to the lineup was the Avante Four and the Avante Four G Package (basically the Avante 2.5 L with a full-time 4WD system). These cars were only available with a 4-speed electronic control type (ECT) automatic transmission. The Tourer V and the automatic-only Avante G 3.0 L (2JZ) models had the option of electronic control flex lockup attaching 4-speed automatic (intelligent) (ECT-iE) transmission, besides the ECT-E automatic in the lower-end models.

These models were only sold with the 4-speed electronic control type (ECT) automatic transmission.

In 1998, the base Tourer model received the optional manual gearbox and a 4WD option was added to the base Avante models; the Avante Four S Package received a higher special-edition interior. Additionally, the Chaser received a facelift, with the most significant changes to the rear tail lights. Other changes included new fog lights with a slightly redesigned front bar to accommodate them, different interior fabric, a 3-spoke steering wheel instead of 4 spokes, orange gauge lighting instead of white and a grille with 2 horizontal bars instead of 3. 

The Chaser was discontinued in June 2001. It was replaced with a new model called the Verossa which shared the same model code. The Cresta suffered the same fate, but the Mark II continued for another generation (X110) before it was also discontinued. In 2004, the all-new X120 Mark X was introduced in Japan, incorporating many characteristics of the Chaser and the Cresta. In fact, the aim of the Mark X was to combine the characteristics of the 3 models into one single model.

Motorsports

Although X100 Chasers took part in the Japanese Touring Car Championship in the 1990s, the Chaser became famous in drifting events, due to its traditional front-engine, rear-wheel-drive layout. Numerous Toyota Chasers, especially the later X90s and X100s, have been modified for use in drift.

References

External links

Toyota Chaser Technical Wikipedia (@ JZX World - jzx100.com)

Chaser
Mid-size cars
Sports sedans
Cars introduced in 1977
Touring cars
1980s cars
1990s cars
2000s cars